The Palazzo Forcella de Seta is an eclectic-style aristocratic palace located facing the Mediterranean in the ancient quarter of Kalsa of central Palermo, region of Sicily, Italy. The palace was built atop the base of the former defensive walls of the city, including the Vega bastion and in its center, an original city gate, Porta dei Greci (1553) through which via Romano Giuseppe runs through. Some refer to the entire structure as the gate. To the seaside, stretches part of the  park Foro Italico. In front of the Northeast corner, in front of the seaside facade, is the Monument to Vincenzo Florio Sr..

History
An opening in the walls towards the sea was present here in the 14th-century this area had been populated by a Greeks, and a church was located here titled San Nicolò dei Greci (also called San Nicolò la Carruba). This church and the gate was replaced in 1553 by orders of the Senate. The gate was briefly called Porta d'Africa when a metal gate looted from the Capture of Mahdia (1550) was installed here by the Viceroy of Sicily, Giovanni de Vega. It is no longer extant. Nor are the bastions once adjacent to this gate.

The present palace building was erected on the ruins of the former “casina a mare” of the Bonanno family, Princes of Cattolica. That casino, or summer palace, was heavily damaged by the rebellions of 1820. Purchased by the marchese Enrico Carlo Forcella in 1833, the structure was rebuilt with an added floor. The architects were Emmanuele Palazzotto and Nicolò Puglia. The building has eclectic quotes from a melange of local styles including Romanesque and Moorish, Gothic, and Neoclassical architecture. In the early 20th-century it was acquired by the marchese Francesco De Seta. It now houses the offices of the Associazione di Costruttori Edile ed Affini de Palermo, or ANCE.

References

Palaces in Palermo